Calderbank railway station served the village of Calderbank, North Lanarkshire, Scotland, from 1887 to 1930 on the Airdrie to Newhouse Branch.

History 
The station was opened on 1 September 1887 by the Caledonian Railway. To the south was a goods yard and to the northeast was a signal box called 'Calderbank Station'. The station closed on 1 December 1930.

References

External links 

Disused railway stations in North Lanarkshire
Former Caledonian Railway stations
Railway stations in Great Britain opened in 1887
Railway stations in Great Britain closed in 1930
1887 establishments in Scotland
1930 disestablishments in Scotland